Turbeville Correctional Institution  is a medium-security state prison for men located in Turbeville, Clarendon County, South Carolina, owned and operated by the South Carolina Department of Corrections.  

The facility was opened in 1994 and has a capacity of 1472 inmates held at medium security:  928 Youthful Offender (ages 17-25) beds and 544 beds for adult population.

References

Prisons in South Carolina
Buildings and structures in Clarendon County, South Carolina
1994 establishments in South Carolina